Nelson Orlando Cossio Riquelme (born 1966-06-14) is a retired football goalkeeper from Chile, who made his debut for the Chile national football team on 1997-01-04 in a friendly against Armenia. He obtained a total number of four caps during his professional career.

Honours

Club
Universidad de Chile
 Primera División de Chile (2): 1994, 1995

References

1966 births
Living people
Chilean people of Italian descent
Footballers from Santiago
Chilean footballers
Chile international footballers
Association football goalkeepers
1997 Copa América players
Club Deportivo Palestino footballers
Deportes Melipilla footballers
C.D. Antofagasta footballers
Everton de Viña del Mar footballers
Universidad de Chile footballers
Audax Italiano footballers
Deportes Temuco footballers
Deportes Iquique footballers
Deportes Concepción (Chile) footballers
Unión Española footballers
San Marcos de Arica footballers
Club Deportivo Universidad Católica footballers
Chilean Primera División players
Primera B de Chile players
Doping cases in association football
Chilean football managers
Deportes Naval managers
O'Higgins F.C. managers
Coquimbo Unido managers
Unión San Felipe managers
San Luis de Quillota managers
Lota Schwager managers
Deportes Melipilla managers
Provincial Osorno managers
Deportes Copiapó managers
Primera B de Chile managers
Chilean Primera División managers
Segunda División Profesional de Chile managers